Antoni ("Toni") Peña Pico  (born 26 August 1970 in Felanitx, Islas Baleares) is a retired male long-distance runner from Spain, who specialized in the marathon during his career.

Achievements

Personal bests
10,000 metres - 28:02.1 min (2000)
Half marathon - 1:01:48 hrs (1992)
Marathon - 2:07:34 hrs (2001)

References

sports-reference

1970 births
Living people
Spanish male long-distance runners
Athletes (track and field) at the 2004 Summer Olympics
Olympic athletes of Spain
People from Felanitx
Spanish male marathon runners